The 1989 Battle of Haouza was an armed confrontation in the Western Sahara War that took place on 11 October 1989, when Polisario Front troops attacked the Moroccan Wall in North Africa's Haouza region. The attack was seen as a POLISARIO response to the delay of the peace conversations with Morocco, and the declarations of Hassan II denying another encounter with Sahrawi representatives.

The Battle 
On 11 October 1989, the Polisario attacked the Moroccan wall in the Haouza region. The Polisario sent a mechanized battalion and a motorized battalion. According to the Polisario, they penetrated up to  into Moroccan territory beyond the wall before being pushed back or withdrawing towards the "Free Zone" east of the wall. Six Moroccan observation posts or bases were taken by the Polisario, the Moroccan soldiers were surprised, but the attack was finally repulsed and the Polisario suffered heavy losses because of the Moroccan air force. The Moroccan air force sent its Gazelle helicopters.

Casualties 
The Moroccan government announced that the Moroccan army has eliminated 101 Polisario fighters, and that 11 Moroccan soldiers were killed (including a lieutenant) and 10 wounded. The Polisario would also have lost 2 BMP-1, 12 jeeps and 6 artillery systems. The Polisario speaks of 190 dead, 150 wounded, and 36 prisoners among Moroccan soldiers.

References 

Hausa 1989
Hausa 1989
Hausa 1989
1989 in Western Sahara
October 1989 events in Africa